Güneydere can refer to:

 Güneydere, Bayburt
 Güneydere, Çüngüş